The Atlantic Soccer Conference tournament was the conference championship tournament in men's soccer for the Atlantic Soccer Conference. The tournament was held annually between 2006 and 2011. The conference disbanded when its membership dwindled to three members.

Champions

Key

Finals

References

Tournament
Atlantic Soccer